Rivetina syriaca is a species of praying mantis in the family Rivetinidae.

See also
List of mantis genera and species

References

S
Mantodea of Asia
Insects of the Middle East
Insects described in 1869